Samuel George Farrant was an English professional footballer who played in the Football League for Stockport County as an inside right.

Personal life 
Prior to the First World War, Farrant served in the Devonshire Regiment. He served as a driver in the Royal Canadian Army Service Corps during the war. Farrant later emigrated to South Africa.

Career statistics

References 

English footballers
English Football League players
Canadian military personnel of World War I
Place of death missing
Bristol City F.C. players
Date of death missing
Association football inside forwards
1885 births
People from Wellington, Somerset
Grays United F.C. players
Southern Football League players
Stockport County F.C. players
Workington A.F.C. players
Luton Town F.C. players
Coventry City F.C. players
Aberdare Town F.C. players
Bath City F.C. players
Devonshire Regiment soldiers
Royal Canadian Army Service Corps soldiers
English emigrants to South Africa